Ss John Fisher and Thomas More RC High School is a coeducational secondary school located in Colne in the English county of Lancashire. The school is named after the Roman Catholic Saints John Fisher and Thomas More. The headteacher from September 2002 to July 2007 was Mr Brendan Conboy, who moved to Our Lady's Catholic College.

Description
Established in 1960, it is a voluntary aided school administered by Lancashire County Council and the Roman Catholic Diocese of Salford. The principal associated primary schools are Holy Saviour RC Primary School in Nelson, Holy Trinity RC Primary School in Brierfield, Sacred Heart RC Primary School in Colne, St John Southworth RC Primary School in Nelson and St Joseph's RC Primary School in Barnoldswick.

Ss John Fisher and Thomas More RC High School offers GCSEs and BTECs as programmes of study for pupils. The school also offers some vocational courses, in conjunction with local further education colleges.

Notable former pupils
Natalie Haythornthwaite, netball player for England & NSW Swifts
Hannah Hobley, actress
Neil Hodgson, former motorcycle racer
Matt Moulding (born 1972), businessman, founder of The Hut Group

References

External links
Ss John Fisher and Thomas More RC High School official website

Secondary schools in Lancashire
Schools in the Borough of Pendle
Catholic secondary schools in the Diocese of Salford
Colne
Educational institutions established in 1960
1960 establishments in England
Voluntary aided schools in England